Keith Henley Sparks was a British attraction designer and developer for theme parks around Europe; an early innovator of theme park attractions and dark rides in the United Kingdom (UK).  He was known for his characteristic production style and attractions for Alton Towers, Blackpool Pleasure Beach, and the Tussauds Group.  Notable attractions he produced include Prof. Burp's Bubble Works, The Haunted House, and Around The World In 80 Days.

References

Amusement ride manufacturers
Animatronic engineers
1936 births
2011 deaths